Liverpool River is a river in the Northern Territory of Australia. It is the largest of the tidal river systems of northern Arnhem Land, which includes two major tributaries, the Tomkinson and Mann Rivers.

Geography
 
The river rises at the eastern end of the Spencer Range and flows in a north-easterly direction, eventually discharging into the Arafura Sea south of Bat Island and to the south west of the Aboriginal Community of Maningrida. Its major tributaries are the Tomkinson and Mann Rivers.

The estuary formed at the river mouth is tidal in nature and in near pristine condition. It is tide dominated in nature with a tide dominated delta having single channel and is surrounded by an area of  covered with mangroves.

The river has a catchment area of  The catchment is wedged between the Goomadeer River catchment to the west, the Blyth River catchment to the east and the Roper River catchment to the south.

History
The river was named by explorer Phillip Parker King in 1818, who named it after the British Prime Minister, Robert Banks Jenkinson, 2nd Earl of Liverpool, otherwise known as Lord Liverpool.

The Liverpool River area was recommended by the explorer Capt. Francis Cadell, following his explorations of 1867–68, as the most likely area in the Top End to succeed as a centre of agriculture and livestock production, and as the site for a capital city.
Less than a year later George Goyder and his 100 men were hard at work, founding the city of Palmerston (present-day Darwin), some 500 km to the west.

See also

List of rivers of Northern Territory

References

Rivers of the Northern Territory